Wedson Nyirenda (born 23 November 1966) is a Zambian football manager and former player.

Playing career
Nyirenda played as a forward for Nchanga Rangers and Power Dynamos in the MTN/FAZ Super Division.

In 1993, he played for Kaizer Chiefs.

Managerial career
Nyirenda coached at Zesco United and Zanaco.

Nyirenda was the head coach of the men's senior Zambia national team having been appointed permanently in January 2017. He resigned in May 2018.

He was involved in the management of the Zambian Under-20 team that won both the Cosafa Under-20 Championship in South Africa and the African Youth Championship.

He presided over the tail end of Zambia's senior national team 2018 World Cup qualifying campaign, where they finished second in a group containing traditional heavyweights Nigeria, Algeria, and Cameroon.

He led Zambia at the African Nations Championships (CHAN) finals. Under his management, the team beat Ivory Coast to top their group. In the quarterfinal, they were upset by Sudan but were praised as having played "an attractive style of football".

In April 2018, he was one of 77 applicants for the vacant Cameroon national team job. In May 2018, he became the head coach of Baroka F.C. Later on, he was appointed as the manager of Lusaka Dynamos in July 2020.

Honours 
Baroka FC
 Telkom Knockout: 2018

References

External links
 

1966 births
Living people
Zambian footballers
Association football forwards
Kaizer Chiefs F.C. players
Zambian football managers
Baroka F.C. managers
Zambia national football team managers
Zambian expatriate footballers
Zambian expatriate sportspeople in South Africa
Expatriate soccer players in South Africa